The Lewis Barnavelt series is a set of juvenile mystery fiction novels starring the fictional American boy Lewis Barnavelt.

The first three titles in the series were written by John Bellairs. Following his death in 1991, his estate commissioned Brad Strickland to write three more based on notes and manuscripts left by Bellairs. Strickland went on to write six more original novels in the series.

List of novels

See also

 Johnny Dixon (series)
 Anthony Monday (series)

Lewis Barnavelt
Lewis Barnavelt
Book series introduced in 1973
Child characters in literature
Characters in children's literature